Yun Ji=hyeok (Korean: 윤지혁; born 7 February 1998 in South Korea) is a South Korean footballer who now plays for Bucheon FC 1995 in his home country.

Career
Yun started his senior career with Jeonbuk Hyundai Motors in the K League 1, where he made one appearance and scored zero goals. After that, he played for Bucheon 1995.

References

External links
 Interview Jeonbuk' Second Kim Min-jae' is coming up 
 Jung Jong-hoon's Build-up (5) Soongsil University's Yoon Ji-hyuk, a notable next-generation central defender

1998 births
Living people
South Korean footballers
Jeonbuk Hyundai Motors players
Association football defenders
Bucheon FC 1995 players